Sparta is an unincorporated community in Knox County, Nebraska, United States.

History
A post office was established at Sparta in 1880, and remained in operation until it was discontinued in 1912. The community was likely named after Sparta, Wisconsin.

References

Unincorporated communities in Knox County, Nebraska
Unincorporated communities in Nebraska